Hollis is an unincorporated community in Oregon County, in the U.S. state of Missouri.

The community is named for the local Hollis family.

References

Unincorporated communities in Oregon County, Missouri
Unincorporated communities in Missouri